"Push the Limits" is a 2000 song created by the musical project, Enigma. The single was the second one released from The Screen Behind the Mirror.

Single track listing
 2-track CD single
 "ATB Mix" – 8:30
 "Album Version" – 6:25

 2-track CD single
 "Radio Edit" – 3:54
 "ATB Radio Remix" – 3:35

 3-track CD single
 "Radio Edit"
 "ATB Radio Remix"
 "ATB Remix"

 4-track CD single
 "Radio Edit"
 "ATB Remix"
 "Album Version"
 "ATB Radio Remix"
 "Multimedia: The Video" (available on some versions)

Chart positions
 #96 Germany
 #76 UK

Enigma (German band) songs
2000 singles
Song recordings produced by Michael Cretu
1999 songs
Songs written by Michael Cretu
Songs written by Jens Gad
Virgin Records singles